The Kiels-McNab House is a historic house located on west Washington Street in Eufaula, Alabama.

Description and history 
It was originally built as a Greek Revival-style cottage of frame and brick construction for Elias M. Kiels in about 1840. In the aftermath of the American Civil War of 1861–1865, the cottage was expanded to a proper mansion. In 1880, it was purchased by John McNab, a banker. It remained in the McNab family until 1973.

It was listed on the National Register of Historic Places on January 21, 1982.

References

Houses on the National Register of Historic Places in Alabama
Houses completed in 1840
Houses in Barbour County, Alabama
Greek Revival houses in Alabama